Honor Oak station may refer to:

 Honor Oak railway station, a former station on the Nunhead to Crystal Palace line, which was open from 1865 to 1954.
 Honor Oak Park railway station, a currently open station on the Brighton Main Line, created in 1886.